This is a list of citadels from around the world. 

See also List of forts, List of fortifications and List of castles.

 Herat Citadel, Afghanistan
 Citadel of Ghazni, Afghanistan
 Antwerp Citadel, Belgium (demolished)
 Citadel of Dinant, Belgium
 Citadel of Huy, Belgium
 Citadel of Liège, Belgium (partially demolished)
 Citadel of Namur, Belgium
 Citadel Počitelj, Bosnia and Herzegovina
 Halifax Citadel, Canada
 Citadelle of Quebec, Canada
 Vyšehrad, Czech Republic
 Špilberk Castle, Czech Republic
 Kastellet, Copenhagen, Denmark
 Cairo Citadel, Egypt
 Citadelle d'Ajaccio, France
 Citadel of Amiens, France
 Citadel of Arras, France
 Citadel of Belfort, France
 Citadel of Belle-Île-en-Mer, France
 Citadel of Besançon, France
 Citadel of Bitche, France
 Citadel of Brouage, France
 Citadel of Calais, France
 Citadel of Entrevaux, France
 Citadel of Lille, France
 Citadel of Mont-Louis, France
 Citadel of Saint-Tropez, France
 Mainz Citadel, Germany
 Petersberg Citadel, Germany
 Spandau Citadel, Germany
 Citadelle Laferrière, Haiti
 Citadella, Hungary
 Citadel Prins Frederik, Indonesia (demolished)
 Cittadella, Italy
 Bam Citadel, Iran
 Kirkuk Citadel, Iraq
 Citadel of Erbil, Iraq (partially ruined)
 Tal Afar Citadel, Iraq
 Jerusalem Citadel or Tower of David, Israel
 Amman Citadel, Amman, Jordan
 Cittadella (Gozo), Malta
 Citadel of 's-Hertogenbosch, the Netherlands
 Intramuros, Philippines
 Warsaw Citadel, Poland
 Peter and Paul Fortress, Russia
 Landskrona Citadel, Sweden
 Citadel of Aleppo, Syria (partly destroyed, being rebuilt)
 Citadel of Salah Ed-Din, Syria (partially ruined)
 Verne Citadel, United Kingdom
 Royal Citadel, Plymouth, United Kingdom

Citadels